Sihai Yang  is a professor in the Department of Chemistry at The University of Manchester. His research in general is based on Inorganic and Materials Chemistry where he and his group investigate on the design and synthesis of novel Metal Organic Frameworks (MOFs) and zeolites for potential applications in gas adsorption, catalysis and industrial separations.

Education 
Sihai Yang completed his Bachelor of Science at Peking University in 2007 and his Doctor of Philosophy degree at University of Nottingham in 2011.

Research and career 
After graduating, Yang received an EPSRC PhD+ Fellowship, an Early Career Leverhulme Trust Fellowship in 2011 at The University of Nottingham. He later received the Nottingham Research Fellowship in 2013 and in 2015 moved to The University of Manchester where he currently is at the position of Professor.

He develops solid materials for applications in clean-air technology, catalysis, biomass conversion, energy storage, separation and conductivity. His team studies a wide range of porous materials based upon metal-organic frameworks, zeolites, and inorganic materials. The key research interest is to investigate the chemical processes involved in host-guest binding underpinning their materials property using state-of-the-art structural and dynamic studies by synchrotron X-ray diffraction, spectroscopy and neutron scattering, combined with modelling. 

Porous materials containing nanosized cavities (1-20 nm), the walls of which are decorated with designed active sites, can form unique functional platforms to study and re-define the chemistry and reactivity of small molecules within the confined space. Research in his group involves design, synthesis and characterisation of the materials, and more importantly, the structural and dynamic studies at National Facilities to understand their materials function at a molecular level. Recent finding includes the discovery of catalytic origins for a range of important biomass conversions, and a series of new metal-organic frameworks showing emerging properties for the clean-up of air pollutants, such as SO2 and NOx.

Notable work 

In 2018, Yang led a research with Martin Schröder where they designed a novel robust Metal Organic Framework (MFM - 300(Al)) which exhibited reversible NO2 isotherm uptake of 14.1 mmol g−1 and also showed the capability to selectively remove low concentrations of NO2 (5,000 to < 1 ppm) from gaseous mixtures. The research revealed five types of supramolecular interactions that cooperatively binds both NO2 and N2O4 molecules within the MFM-300(Al) framework and also showed the coexistence of helical monomer–dimer chains of NO2 within the framework which provided an initial understanding of the behavior of guest molecules within porous hosts which may provide further development routes of future NO2 capture and conversion technologies.

In 2019, Yang led a further research with Martin Schröder where a novel Metal Organic Framework (MFM - 520) was synthesized which showcased a high adsorption capacity of NO2 (4.2 mmol g−1). The framework also showed a high turn over number and treatment of captured NO2 in the framework with water led to a quantitative conversion of the captured NO2 into HNO3 which is an important feedstock for fertilizer production.

Awards and nominations 
 Harrison Meldola Memorial Prize (2020)
 CCDC Chemical Crystallography Prize for Younger Scientists (2019)
 ISIS Neutron & Muon Source Impact Awards (2019)
 Institute of Physics B T M Willis Prize (2013)

Major Publications

References

Living people
Chinese chemists
Academics of the University of Manchester
21st-century chemists
Alumni of the University of Nottingham
Year of birth missing (living people)